"Feel My Way to You" is a song recorded by American country music group Restless Heart.  It was released in July 2004 as the first single from the album Still Restless.  The song reached #29 on the Billboard Hot Country Singles & Tracks chart.  The song was written by Danny Orton and Jennifer Schot.

Critical reception
Deborah Evans Price of Billboard thought that the song sounded "fresh and breezy" in the context of Restless Heart's reunion. She also praised the lyrics, Larry Stewart's lead vocal, and the use of mandolin in the production.

Chart performance

References

2004 singles
2004 songs
Restless Heart songs
Songs written by Danny Orton
Song recordings produced by Kyle Lehning